Dylan James (born 25 May 1991) is a New Zealand professional wrestler and mixed martial artist. He is currently signed to Rizin Fighting Federation and Pro Wrestling Land's End. He is best known for working for All Japan Pro Wrestling, where he is a former World Tag Team Champion (with Ryoji Sai) and 2018 World's Strongest Tag Determination League tournament winner (with Joe Doering) and in Pro Wrestling Zero1 where he worked under the ring name James Raideen.  He defeated Masato Tanaka to become a World Heavyweight Champion.

Mixed martial arts career
On September 27, 2020, he made his mixed martial arts debut with Rizin Fighting Federation in a losing effort to Sudario Tsuyoshi, due to doctor stoppage after the first round.

Mixed martial arts record

|-
|Loss
|align=center|0–1
|Sudario Tsuyoshi
|TKO (doctor stoppage)
|Rizin 24 – Saitama
|
|align=center|1
|align=center|5:00
|Saitama, Japan
|

Championships and accomplishments
All Japan Pro Wrestling
World Tag Team Championship (1 time) – with Ryoji Sai
World's Strongest Tag Determination League (2018) – with Joe Doering
Impact Pro Wrestling
IPW New Zealand Tag Team Championship – with Dave Deluxeo
Pro Wrestling A-TEAM
WEW Heavyweight Championship (1 time)
 Pro Wrestling Illustrated
 Ranked No. 116 of the top 500 singles wrestlers in the PWI 500 in 2018
Pro Wrestling Zero1
NWA Intercontinental Tag Team Championship (1 time) – with Masato Tanaka
NWA United National Heavyweight Championship (1 time)
World Heavyweight Championship (1 time)
Fire Festival (2013)
Furinkazan (2012) – with Zeus

References

External links

1991 births
Living people
Sportspeople from Auckland
New Zealand male professional wrestlers
New Zealand male mixed martial artists
Mixed martial artists utilizing wrestling
New Zealand expatriate sportspeople in Japan
Expatriate professional wrestlers in Japan
20th-century New Zealand people
21st-century New Zealand people
World Tag Team Champions (AJPW)